Gábor Máté (born 29 April 1955) is a Hungarian actor and film director. He appeared in more than seventy films since 1976.

Selected filmography

References

External links 

1955 births
Living people
Hungarian male film actors